The Puerto Rican Independence Party (PIP) is a social-democratic political party in Puerto Rico that campaigns for the independence of Puerto Rico from the United States.

Those who follow the PIP ideology are usually called independentistas, pipiolos, or sometimes just pro-independence activists.

History

The party began as the electoral wing of the Puerto Rican independence movement. It is the largest of the independence parties, and the only one that is on the ballot during elections (other candidates must be added in by hand). In 1948, two years after being founded, the PIP gathered 10.2% of the votes in the island. In 1952, two years after an armed uprising of the Puerto Rican Nationalist Party, it obtained 19% of the votes, its highest electoral support ever, which made it the second electoral party on the island for a moment. In 1956 it took 12.4% of the votes; in 1960 3.1%; in 1964, 4%; in 1968, 3.5; in 1972, 5.4; in 1976, 5.7; in 1980, 5.4; in 1984, 3.6, and in 1988, 5.5. In 2004 it obtained 2.7% of the votes, and in 2008 it took 2%.

Foundation
The party was founded on 27 October 1946, by Gilberto Concepción de Gracia (1909–1968), his colleague Fernando Milán Suárez and Antonio J. González.  They felt the independence movement had been betrayed by the Popular Democratic Party, whose ultimate goal had originally been independence.

FBI surveillance of the party
Former FBI Director Louis Freeh admitted 2003 in a congressional budget hearing that the FBI had engaged  in suppression of Puerto Rican independence groups from the 1930s to the 1990s, including surveillance of the 
Puerto Rican Independence Party. The actions undertaken by the FBI have been described as "egregious illegal action, maybe criminal action."

After Freeh's public admission, The New York Times reported the following details about actions against the Puerto Rican Independence Party:

The FBI's surveillance of persons and organizations advocating Puerto Rico's independence, was not only recognized by the FBI's top leadership, but was also detailed in 1.8 million documents, a fraction of which were released in 2000.

The political repression of the party and the independence movement at large by the U.S. Federal Government between the years 1930 and 1975, coupled with an absorption of some cultural-nationalist ideology by the populares in the years thereafter have been identified as major reasons for the electoral decline of the party leading to its loss of official status in 2008.

1970s
In 1971, the PIP gubernatorial candidate, Rubén Berríos led a protest against the US Navy in Culebra.  During the 1972 elections, the PIP showed the largest growth in its history while running a democratic socialist, pro-worker, pro-poor campaign. One year later during a delegate assembly Rubén Berríos declared that the party was not presenting a Marxist–Leninist platform and took the matter to the PIP's assembly which voted in favor of the party's current stance in favor of social democracy. The Marxist–Leninist faction, called the "terceristas", split into several groups. The biggest of them went into the Popular Socialist Movement, while the rest went into the Puerto Rican Socialist Party.

1990s

In 1999, PIP leaders, especially Rubén Berríos, became involved in the Navy-Vieques protests started by many citizens of Vieques against the presence of the US military in the island-municipality (see also: Cause of Vieques).

2008 election
During the 2008 elections, the PIP lost official recognition for the second time, obtaining 2.04% of the gubernatorial vote.  Loss of recognition was official on 2 January 2009.  The minimum vote percentage to keep official recognition is 3.0% as per the Commonwealth of Puerto Rico law. The party also lost both of its seats in the legislature, where they had had one seat in each house.

In May 2009, the party submitted more than 100,000 signed petitions to the Puerto Rico's elections commission and regained legal status.

2012 election
During the 2012 elections, the PIP lost official recognition for the third time, obtaining 2.5% of the gubernatorial vote. Loss of recognition will be official on 2 January 2013. The minimum vote percentage to keep official recognition is 3.0% as per the Commonwealth of Puerto Rico law.

2016 election
For the 2016 election, Senator María de Lourdes Santiago was the party's nominee. She obtained 33,452 votes and came in fifth place, with 2.1% of the vote. Some of the senator's main policies for the election are outlined below

 Increase the basic teacher's salary to $3,000 per month.
 Universal healthcare through the National Health Plan.
 Merge the House of Representatives and the Senate into one unicameral chamber, whereby the members are elected by proportional representation.
 Change the status of Puerto Rico to that of a Freely Associated State.

2020 election
For the 2020 election, Juan Dalmau was the party's nominee. He obtained 175,402 votes and came in fourth place, with a historic 13.58% of the vote, the second-best electoral performance in PIP history. With the Movimiento Victoria Ciudadana (Citizens' Victory Movement) obtaining 179,265 votes and coming in third place with 13.95% of the vote, this has been the largest share of the Puerto Rican vote (27.53%) ever gained by left-wing parties in Puerto Rico.

International support
{{External media
| align  = center
| audio1 =  You may watch and listen to a Puerto Rican Independence Party political campaign ad featuring Ruben Berrios and the voice of José Feliciano in an interpretation of Antonio Caban Vales' "Verde Luz'''" here.]
}}

The PIP cause receives moral support by international organizations. Examples of these are the Socialist International (the largest organization of political parties in the world), including fifteen political parties which are in power in Latin America. The government of Cuba also supports it, as well as the ex-president of Panama, Martín Torrijos, and a wide group of world-recognized writers and artists."Prominentes figuras de América Latina apoyan la independencia de Puerto Rico - Escritores y artistas declaran su adhesión a la Proclama de Panamá" www.independencia.net/topicos/panama/cpi_panama_nov06.html

On 26 January 2007, the Nobel Prize laureate Gabriel García Márquez joined other figures such as Mario Benedetti, Ernesto Sábato, Thiago de Mello, Eduardo Galeano, Carlos Monsiváis, Pablo Armando Fernández, Jorge Enrique Adoum, Pablo Milanés, Luis Rafael Sánchez, Mayra Montero and Ana Lydia Vega, in supporting independence for Puerto Rico and joining the Latin American and Caribbean Congress in Solidarity with Puerto Rico's Independence, which approved a resolution favoring the island's right to assert its independence, as ratified unanimously by political parties hailing from 22 countries in November 2006. García Márquez's push for the recognition of Puerto Rico's independence was obtained at the behest of the Puerto Rican Independence Party. His pledge for support to the Puerto Rican Independence Movement was part of a wider effort that emerged from the Latin American and Caribbean Congress in Solidarity with Puerto Rico's Independence.

On 18 June 2021 the United Nations associated Special Committee on Decolonization published a draft resolution calling on the United States to facillitate a process that enables the people of Puerto Rico to exercise their right to self-determination and independence. Juan Dalmau spoke before the committee to represent the party stating that the colonial experience of the United States in Puerto Rico had failed and its harmful consequences were still visible.

Party platform and ideology

PIP anti-war mobilization and protests
As reported in numerous media, the PIP's leadership and active members participated in anti-war protests and mobilization to resist the Iraq War and oppose the U.S. government's efforts to encourage Puerto Ricans to enlist in the U.S. Armed Forces. The Washington Post wrote in August 2007 that "on this island with a long tradition of military service, pro-independence advocates are tapping the territory's growing anti-Iraq war sentiment to revitalize their cause. As a result, 57 percent of Puerto Rico's 10th-, 11th- and 12th-graders, or their parents, have signed forms over the past year withholding contact information from the Pentagon. ... For five years, PIP has issued opt-out forms to about 120,000 students in Puerto Rico and encouraged them to sign—and independista activists expect this year to mark their most successful effort yet." The article also quoted Juan Dalmau, then-secretary general of the Puerto Rican Independence Party as saying: "if the death of a Puerto Rican soldier is tragic, it's more tragic if that soldier has no say in that war [with Iraq]" and that he did not want the children of Puerto Rico to become "colonial cannon meat."

Another article in The Progressive also reported on PIP's anti-war activity. It was written three years earlier, in 2004, but it still noted that "some groups like the Puerto Rico Bar Association and the Independence Party have registered strong protests against the deployments. In an attempt to draw attention to Puerto Ricans' lack of elected representatives, even the usually pro-U.S. statehood party has raised concerns about the disproportionate body count suffered by islanders." Two years later, it was reported that PIP, along with hundreds of other supporters of Puerto Rican independence "blocked the entrance to the U.S. Federal Courthouse here on Feb. 20 to denounce recent FBI raids against the homes and workplaces of ... supporters of Puerto Rican independence ... and the growing repression by the FBI against the independence movement in general." This demonstration reportedly marked the beginning of PIP "campaign to get the FBI out of Puerto Rico."

PIP stance on Puerto Rico's economic crisis and taxation system
During the 2005–2007 Puerto Rico economic crisis, the Puerto Rican Independence Party submitted various bills that would have taxed corporations making $1 million or more in annual net profits an extra ten percent above the average tax rate these corporations pay, which hovers around 5%. The PNP and the PPD parties amended the bill, taxing the corporations the traditional lower rate. Despite objections presented by the PIP, the PNP and PPD also allowed the companies to claim the additional tax as a credit on next year's bill, making the "tax", in effect, a one-year loan. Puerto Rico has been said "There is no place in the territorial limits of the United States that provides such an advantageous base for exporters. " Because of this, many US companies moved their headquarters and manufacturing facilities there. This is why the PNP and PPD believed the tax increase would exacerbate the problems

Disfranchisement due to residence in Puerto Rico
United States citizens residing in the U.S. commonwealth of Puerto Rico do not hold the right to vote in U.S. presidential elections. Although Puerto Rico residents elect a Resident Commissioner to the United States House of Representatives, that official may not participate in votes determining the final passage of legislation. Furthermore, Puerto Rico holds no representation of any kind in the United States Senate.

Both the Puerto Rican Independence Party and the New Progressive Party of Puerto Rico officially oppose the island's political status quo and consider Puerto Rico's lack of federal representation to be disfranchisement. The remaining political organization, the Popular Democratic Party, is less active in its opposition of this case of disfranchisement but has officially stated that it favors fixing the remaining "deficits of democracy" that the Clinton and George W. Bush administrations have publicly recognized in writing through Presidential Task Force Reports.

Party symbol

The flag's green color stands for the hope of becoming free, and the white cross stands for the sacrifice and commitment of the party with democracy.  The flag's design is based on the first national flag ever flown by Puerto Ricans, which is also the current flag of the municipality of Lares, location where the first relatively successful attempt of revolutionary insurgency in Puerto Rico, called Grito de Lares, took place on 23 September 1868. The Lares flag is, on the other hand, similar to that of the Dominican Republic, since the Grito's mastermind, Ramón Emeterio Betances, not only admired the Dominican pro-independence struggle, but was also half-Dominican himself. The party's flag is based on the Nordic Cross flag design. Nordic Cross flags, or Latin cross flags, are a common design in Scandinavia and other parts of the world, and in theory, the PIP's emblem belongs to this family of flags.

Electoral performance

Governor of Puerto Rico (Gobernador de Puerto Rico)

Resident Commissioner of Puerto Rico (Comisionado Residente de Puerto Rico)

Legislative elections

Important party leaders
 Rubén Berríos – President, former Senator and Honorary President of the Socialist International (SI)
 Manuel Rodríguez Orellana – Secretary of Relations with North America
 Fernando Martín – Executive President, former Senator
 María de Lourdes Santiago Negrón – Vice-President, Senator
 Juan Dalmau Ramírez – Secretary General & Electoral Commissioner
 Edwin Irizarry Mora – Secretary of Economic Affairs
 David Noriega – Former Representative. Gubernatorial candidate in 1996 general elections. He resigned from the party in the late 1990s.
 Roberto Iván Aponte – Secretary of Municipal Organization
 Luis Roberto Piñero – President of the Pro-Independence Advocates' Campaign in favor of unifying both Houses of the Legislature into a single, unicameral Parliament
 Víctor García San Inocencio – Former Representative
 Jorge Fernández Porto – Adviser on Environmental Sciences and Public Policy Affairs
 Jessica Martínez – Member of Pro-Independence Advocates' Campaign in Favor of a single, unicameral Parliament
 Gilberto Concepción de Gracia – Founding President and respected Latin American Leader

See also

 Latin American and Caribbean Congress in Solidarity with Puerto Rico's Independence
 List of political parties in Puerto Rico
 Puerto Rican Socialist Party
 Cause of Vieques
 Cerro Maravilla murders
 Navy-Culebra protests
 Navy-Vieques protests
 Politics of Puerto Rico
 Socialist International

References

 Puerto Rican Independence Party (1998). Retrieved 6 January 2004 from www.independencia.net/ingles/welcome.html''

External links
 Portraits of Notable Individuals in the Struggle for Puerto Rican Independence
 Bill promoting Sr. Fernando Milan, hijo, for governor of Puerto Rico by the Puerto Rican Independence Party
 Official website of the Puerto Rican Independence Party

Pro-independence parties
COINTELPRO targets
Political parties in Puerto Rico
Left-wing nationalist parties
Social democratic parties
Socialism in Puerto Rico
Political parties established in 1946
National liberation movements
Political history of Puerto Rico
Secessionist organizations
Politics of the Americas
Politics of the Caribbean
Politics of Puerto Rico
Political organizations based in Puerto Rico
Independence movements
Puerto Rican nationalism
Puerto Rican independence movement
1946 establishments in Puerto Rico